Ahn Byeong-keun (born in Daegu, February 23, 1962) is a retired judoka from South Korea, who represented his native country at the 1984 Summer Olympics. There he claimed the gold medal in the men's lightweight division (– 71 kg) by defeating Italy's Ezio Gamba in the final. He participated at the 1992 Summer Olympics as a coach.

References

External links
 

1962 births
Living people
People from Daegu
Sportspeople from Daegu
Olympic judoka of South Korea
Judoka at the 1984 Summer Olympics
Judoka at the 1988 Summer Olympics
Olympic gold medalists for South Korea
Olympic medalists in judo
Asian Games medalists in judo
Judoka at the 1986 Asian Games
South Korean male judoka
Medalists at the 1984 Summer Olympics
Asian Games gold medalists for South Korea
Medalists at the 1986 Asian Games
20th-century South Korean people